Zane Williams (born 1977) is an American country music singer. He is best known for his song "Hurry Home", covered by Jason Michael Carroll.

Career
Zane Williams is an anomaly in today's country music scene, a modern-day “throwback” who is equal parts bar-room entertainer and introspective poet.  Williams was a finalist in three categories at MerleFest's Chris Austin Song Contest, claiming top slots in both the Country and General categories. "Hurry Home" was also selected as the $20,000 Maxell Song of the Year in the John Lennon Songwriting Contest. Williams released the album Hurry Home in 2006. He signed a publishing deal with Big Yellow Dog Music in 2007. The album's title track was released as a single by Jason Michael Carroll in 2009.

Williams has toured extensively throughout the United States, including Missouri, Alabama, and Texas.

In January 2010, Williams released an album titled The Right Place, which he co-produced with Radney Foster. Jessica Phillips of Country Weekly magazine gave the album three-and-a-half stars out of five, saying, "If you're in the mood for true honky-tonk music, you're in the right place." Ride with Me followed in 2011.

Williams has received radio airplay on country stations across Texas that led to his first entry on the Texas Music Chart with "Ride With Me", from the 2011 album with the same title. He is also one of the featured artists on Troubadour Texas, a television show documenting his rising career.

In June 2013, Williams released an album titled Overnight Success. He wrote all 11 songs on the album, and co-produced it with Tom Faulkner. The album debuted on the Billboard'''s Heatseekers South Central chart at No. 4.  The video for the title track was on CMT Pure's 12-Pack Countdown for three weeks in a row and peaked at No. 2. The video has also been featured on GAC's daily countdown along with The Nashville Network featuring William's "Overnight Success" music video in their Top 10 Rising Stars.

2015: Texas Like That
In 2015 Williams released another studio album, Texas Like That, complete with 10 new self penned songs. The tracks in the album ranged from the romantic ballad "She Is" to the toe-tapping "Just Gettin’ Started", and the fan tribute song "Here’s to You".  Among the stronger tunes are “Jayton and Jill” and the "Kansas City Sunrise".Texas Like That was released on April 14, 2015, and debuted on Top Country Albums chart at No. 31 and Heatseeker Albums at No.8, his highest charting album thus far, with 1,500 copies sold in its debut week.

2016: Bringin' Country Back
In 2016, the title track from his next album, Bringin' Country Back'', was released on July 8, 2016 as a single.  Williams wrote all eleven songs on the album, and produced the entire album himself.  The album was released on October 21, 2016.  The album debuted at No. 46 on the Top Country Album chart, and No. 22 on the Heatseekers Album, with 800 copies sold in its debut week.

Discography

Albums

Music videos

References

External links
 OfficialWebsite
 IAMA (International Acoustic Music Awards

1977 births
Living people
American country singer-songwriters
People from Abilene, Texas
People from McKinney, Texas
American members of the Churches of Christ
Singer-songwriters from Texas
21st-century American singers
Country musicians from Texas